is a Japanese actress and fashion model She is represented with Horipro.

Videography

Videos

Filmography

TV drama

Internet drama

Films

Stage

Advertisements

Advertising

Newspapers

Bibliography

Photo albums

Magazines

References

External links
 
 

Japanese television actresses
Japanese female models
Japanese gravure models
People from Nakama, Fukuoka
Actors from Fukuoka Prefecture
1995 births
Living people
Japanese film actresses
21st-century Japanese actresses
Models from Fukuoka Prefecture